Kelbrook is a village in the civil parish of Kelbrook and Sough, Borough of Pendle, in Lancashire, England. It lies on the A56 road between Colne and Earby.

Historically a part of the now divided old parish of Thornton-in-Craven in the West Riding of Yorkshire, Kelbrook was administered as part of Skipton Rural District, until boundary changes in 1974.  Kelbrook lies in West Craven, so keeping cultural links with Yorkshire and Craven.

Kelbrook School is situated in the heart of the village. The highest building in the village is the village church, St Mary's of Kelbrook. Other local towns and villages are Barnoldswick - 2 miles west, Earby - 1 mile north, Salterforth - 1 mile west, Thornton in Craven - 2 miles north, Foulridge - 2 miles south, Colne - 3½ miles south.

Elisabeth Beresford, the creator of the Wombles, wrote much of the second Wombles book, The Wandering Wombles, whilst staying in a cottage on Dotcliffe Road in 1970. The Kelbrook and Sough Wombles, the local litter-picking group made up of local residents, is named in tribute to this local nexus. Edward Woodward lived in Kelbrook for six weeks in 1973 whilst preparing for his role in The Wicker Man.

The residents of Kelbrook are affectionately called Kelbricks.

During a wedding it is tradition for young residents of the village to lock the church gates and demand money from the bride and groom. A more recent custom is to make scarecrows of literary characters from children's books and to race ducks. on Kelbrook Beck.

Tourism
The main A56 road runs through the village. Kelbrook has one public house named the Craven Heifer, named after a local cow, the eponymous Craven Heifer, which was born in 1807 and achieved nationwide fame due to its size. The public house was previously named the Scotsmans Arms. The public house changed name between 1853 and 1891.

Other attractions include the Kelbrook Pottery factory  and the annual art exhibition. The village also has a fish and chip restaurant  and a petrol station with a shop.

See also
Listed buildings in Kelbrook and Sough

References

Towns and villages in the Borough of Pendle
History of Yorkshire